Dominique Harize, born 26 February 1956, was a rugby union player who was capped 9 times. He played with France

Harize played as Wing for the Stade Toulousain. He was a member of the French team that won the Five Nations Championship in 1977 (Grand Slam) with the same fifteen players in all four matches and without conceding a try.

External links 
 ESPN profile

Living people
French rugby union players
France international rugby union players
Stade Toulousain players
1956 births
Rugby union wings